András Keresztúri (born 2 November 1967) is a Hungarian footballer who last played for Békéscsabai Előre as striker.

References
 Ki kicsoda a magyar sportéletben? [Who's Who in the Hungarian Sport Life], Volume 2 (I–R). Szekszárd, Babits Kiadó, 1995, p. 99. 
 Futballévkönyv 2003 [Football Yearbook 2003], Volume I, Aréna 2000 kiadó, Budapest, 2004, pp. 104–109.

External links
 

1967 births
Living people
Hungarian footballers
Ferencvárosi TC footballers
MTK Budapest FC players
FK Austria Wien players
Fehérvár FC players
Csepel SC footballers
ŠK Slovan Bratislava players
Slovak Super Liga players
Association football defenders
Békéscsaba 1912 Előre footballers
Expatriate footballers in Slovakia
Expatriate footballers in Austria
Hungarian expatriate sportspeople in Slovakia
Hungarian expatriate sportspeople in Austria
Hungary international footballers
People from Cegléd
Sportspeople from Pest County